The 1968 United States presidential election in Arizona took place on November 5, 1968. All fifty states and the District of Columbia were part of the 1968 United States presidential election. State voters chose five electors to the Electoral College, who voted for president and vice president.

Arizona was won by the Republican nominees, Richard Nixon of New York and his running mate Governor Spiro Agnew of Maryland. Nixon and Agnew defeated the Democratic nominees, Incumbent Vice President Hubert Humphrey of Minnesota and his running mate U.S. Senator Edmund Muskie of Maine. 

Nixon carried the state with 54.78% of the vote to Humphrey's 35.02%, a victory margin of 19.76%.

Statewide Results

Results by county

Notes

References

1968
Arizona